A Moment of Innocence is a 1996 film directed by Mohsen Makhmalbaf. It is also known as Nun va Goldoon, Bread and Flower, Bread and Flower Pot, and The Bread and the Vase.

Plot
The film is a semi-autobiographical account of Makhmalbaf's experience as a teenager when, as a seventeen-year-old, he stabbed a policeman at a protest rally and was jailed.

Two decades later, Makhmalbaf made the decision to track down the policeman whom he had injured in an attempt to make amends. A Moment of Innocence is a dramatization of that real event.

Cast
 Mirhadi Tayebi as The Policeman
 Mohsen Makhmalbaf as The Director
Ammar Tafti as The Young Director
Ali Bakhsi as The Young Policeman
 Maryam Mohamadamini as The Young Woman

Reception

Critical response
Although the film was banned in Iran, Western critics were very positive toward the film. Mike D'Angelo called A Moment of Innocence "a dizzying hybrid of autobiography, documentary, and mythology,...[a] bold[]...testament to our innate decency and capacity for love," and said that it "ends with the greatest final freeze-frame since The 400 Blows -- maybe the greatest final freeze-frame ever."  Stuart Klawans of The Nation said readers should contact him immediately "if [they] see another film with so urgent and complete an image of people's hurts, fears, needs and dreams."  One of the few negative critical reactions came from Mick Lasalle of the San Francisco Chronicle, who called the film "grindingly dull," and "muddled and endless" and implied that Makhmalbaf's filmmaking was "self-indulgent, meandering, pointless and irritating."

In the 2012 Greatest Films of All Time critics' poll by Sight & Sound, A Moment of Innocence was ranked 235th among all films, making it tied with The House is Black, Where Is the Friend's Home?, and The Wind Will Carry Us as the second-highest ranked Iranian film (behind Close-Up).

References

External links
 
A Cinematic Gem: The Worldwide of a Moment of Innocence by Kim Ji-Seok

1996 films
French drama films
Iranian drama films
1996 drama films
Films directed by Mohsen Makhmalbaf
Film controversies in Iran
1990s French films